Viktor Grigorievich Rybakov (born May 28, 1956 in Magadan) is a retired boxer, who represented the USSR twice at the Summer Olympics during his career as an Olympian. He won the bronze medal in the bantamweight division (– 54 kg) at the 1976 Summer Olympics in Montreal, Quebec, Canada, and repeated that feat four years later in Moscow, Soviet Union. He trained at the Trud Sports Society until 1976. Later he trained at the Armed Forces sports society.

Olympic results 
Below are the Olympic results of Viktor Rybakov, a boxer from the Soviet Union who competed at both the 1976 Olympics in Montreal and the 1980 Olympics in Moscow:

Montreal - 1976
Viktor Rybakov competed as a bantamweight in this tournament:

 Round of 64: bye
 Round of 32: Defeated Alfred Siame (Zambia) by walkover
 Round of 16: Defeated Hitoshi Ishigaki (Japan) by decision, 5-0
 Quarterfinal: Defeated Stephan Förster (East Germany) by decision, 3-2
 Semifinal: Lost to Charles Mooney (United States) by decision, 1-4

Moscow - 1980
Viktor Rybakov competed as a featherweight in this tournament:

 Round of 64: bye
 Round of 32: Defeated Daniel Londas (France) by decision, 5-0
 Round of 16: Defeated Peter Hanlon (Great Britain) by decision, 5-0
 Quarterfinal: Defeated Tzacho Andreikowski (Bulgaria) by decision, 4-1
 Semifinal: Lost to Rudi Fink (East Germany) by decision, 1-4

References

 databaseOlympics

1956 births
Living people
People from Magadan
Soviet male boxers
Bantamweight boxers
Boxers at the 1976 Summer Olympics
Boxers at the 1980 Summer Olympics
Olympic boxers of the Soviet Union
Olympic bronze medalists for the Soviet Union
Olympic medalists in boxing
Russian male boxers
Medalists at the 1980 Summer Olympics
Medalists at the 1976 Summer Olympics
Sportspeople convicted of crimes
Sportspeople from Magadan Oblast